Giorgos Ninios (born 1959) is a Greek television, film and stage actor with an extensive filmography.

He has won two awards at the Thessaloniki Film Festival for Best Supporting Actor in 1989 and 1991.

External links

1951 births
Living people
People from Naxos
Greek male film actors
Greek male stage actors
Greek male television actors
Place of birth missing (living people)
Date of birth missing (living people)